Mycoreovirus is a genus of double-stranded RNA viruses in the family Reoviridae and subfamily Spinareovirinae. Fungi serve as natural hosts. Diseases associated with this genus include: hypovirulence of the fungal host. The name of the group derives from Ancient Greek myco which means fungus. There are three species in this genus.

Structure

Viruses in genus Mycoreovirus are non-enveloped with icosahedral geometries. The outer capsid has T=13 symmetry and the inner capsid has T=2 symmetry. The diameter is around 80 nm. Genomes are linear and segmented, and around 23 kbp in total length. The genome codes for 12 proteins.

Life cycle

Viral replication is cytoplasmic. Entry into the host cell is achieved by attachment to host receptors, which mediates endocytosis. Replication follows the double-stranded RNA virus replication model. Double-stranded RNA virus transcription is the method of transcription. The virus exits the host cell by cell to cell movement, and monopartite non-tubule guided viral movement. Fungi serve as the natural host.

Taxonomy
There are three species in this genus:
Mycoreovirus 1
Mycoreovirus 2
Mycoreovirus 3

References

External links
 Viralzone: Mycoreovirus
 ICTV

Virus genera
Spinareovirinae